Nina Güthner (1835–1905, née von Fuchs-Bimbach) was a German writer.

She was born at Schloss Bimbach or Bimbach Castle near Prichsenstadt in Bavaria, Germany. She wrote a play that was staged at what is today known as the National Theatre Munich, and contributed to literary magazines.

References

External links
 Love poems by Nina Güthner (in German)

1835 births
1905 deaths
German women writers
19th-century women writers